The Professional Women's Bowling Association (PWBA) Tour returned from a 12-year hiatus in 2015, thanks to a three-year funding commitment from the USBC and BPAA. The 2015 tour had ten stops (seven standard tournaments and three majors), running from May 13 to September 13. Major tour stops included the following:

 USBC Queens (May 13–19, Green Bay, WI)
 Bowlmor AMF U.S. Women's Open (Aug. 31-Sept. 6, North Brunswick, NJ)
 The Smithfield PWBA Tour Championship (Sept. 10-13, Garland, TX)

Standard stops have a guaranteed prize fund of $60,000 (minimum $10,000 first prize). The U.S. Women's Open has a top prize of $50,000, while the other two majors award a $20,000 top prize. The USBC Queens finals were broadcast live May 19 on ESPN2. The U.S. Women's open finals (September 6) and PWBA Tour Championship finals (September 13) were broadcast live on CBS Sports Network.

Additionally, a new partnership with the Professional Bowlers Association (PBA) provides:

 Seven PWBA (women-only) Regional tournaments conducted by the PBA's respective regional managers, each with a $10,000 prize fund based on a minimum of 40 entries. 
 Player services transportation and mobile pro shop for the PWBA Tour stops.
 Live coverage of the PWBA Tour stops through Xtra Frame, the PBA's online video streaming service.
 Eligibility for PWBA members to bowl in all PBA events.
 An expanded points program for women bowling in PBA Regionals, culminating in the ESPN-televised PWBA Regional Challenge at the PBA World Series of Bowling VII.
 A crossover event with the PBA Tour—the Striking Against Breast Cancer Mixed Doubles tournament on July 31-August 2.

Tournament summary

Below is a recap of events held during the 2015 PWBA Tour season. Major tournaments are in bold. Career PWBA title numbers for winners are shown in parenthesis (#).

C: broadcast on CBS Sports Network
E2: broadcast on ESPN 2
X: broadcast on the PBA's Xtra Frame webcast service
 *Through the PWBA Tour's final season before its hiatus (2003), Liz Johnson had 11 titles. The PWBA has since credited her three majors won during the hiatus as PWBA titles, giving her 14 titles prior to the start of the 2015 season.

References

External links
PWBA.com, home of the Professional Women' Bowling Association

2015 in bowling